Celosia is a small genus of edible and ornamental plants in the amaranth family, Amaranthaceae. Its species are commonly known as woolflowers, or, if the flower heads are crested by fasciation, cockscombs. The plants are well known in East Africa's highlands and are used under their Swahili name, .

Taxonomy 
The generic name is derived from the Ancient Greek word , meaning "burning", and refers to the colourful flame-like flower heads.

Uses

As a garden plant 
The plant is an annual. Seed production in these species can be very high, 200–700 kg per hectare.  One ounce of seed may contain up to 43,000 seeds. One thousand seeds can weigh 1.0–1.2 grams.  Depending upon the location and fertility of the soil, blossoms can last 8–10 weeks.

C. argentea and C. cristata are common garden ornamental plants.

As food 
Celosia argentea var. argentea or Lagos spinach (a.k.a. quail grass, soko, celosia, feather cockscomb) is a broadleaf annual leaf vegetable.  It grows widespread across Mexico, where it is known as "velvet flower", northern South America, tropical Africa, the West Indies, South, East and Southeast Asia where it is grown as a native or naturalized wildflower, and is cultivated as a nutritious leafy green vegetable.  It is traditional fare in the countries of Central and West Africa, and is one of the leading leafy green vegetables in Nigeria, where it is known as "", meaning "make husbands fat and happy". In Spain it is known as "Rooster comb" because of its appearance.

As a grain, Celosia is a pseudo-cereal, not a true cereal.

These leaves, young stems and young inflorescences are used for stew, as they soften up readily in cooking. The leaves also have a soft texture and a mild spinach-like taste.

Cultivation

Despite its African origin (a claim that is not without dispute), Celosia is known as a foodstuff in Indonesia and India. Moreover, in the future it might become more widely eaten, especially in the hot and malnourished regions of the equatorial zone. In that regard, it has already been hailed as the often-wished-for vegetable that "grows like a weed without demanding all the tender loving care that other vegetables seem to need"; one person said of his time growing it as this: "Every place I have tried it, it grows with no work. We have had no disease problems and very little insect damage. It reseeds itself abundantly and new plants have come up in the immediate vicinity."

Works well in humid areas and is the most-used leafy plant in Nigeria. It grows in the wet season and grows well while other plants succumb to mold and other diseases like mildew. Though a very simple plant, Celosia does need moderate soil moisture.

Selected species 
Celosia argentea L.
Celosia cristata L.
Celosia floribunda A. Gray
Celosia isertii C.C.Towns.
Celosia leptostachya Benth.
Celosia nitida Vahl
Celosia odorata T.Cooke
Celosia palmeri S.Watson
Celosia spicata L.
Celosia trigyna L.
Celosia virgata Jacq.
Celosia whitei W.F.Grant

Formerly placed here 
Chamissoa altissima (Jacq.) Kunth (as C. tomentosa Humb. & Bonpl. ex Schult.)
Deeringia amaranthoides (Lam.) Merr. (as C. baccata Retz.)
Deeringia polysperma (Roxb.) Moq. (as C. polysperma Roxb.)
Iresine diffusa Humb. & Bonpl. ex Willd. (as C. paniculata L.)

Images

References 

Uses and Growth of Celosia spp.
Virtual Flowers Celosia Information

External links 
 
 

 
Amaranthaceae genera
Leaf vegetables
Pseudocereals